is a Japanese professional footballer who plays as a goalkeeper for Thespakusatsu Gunma in the J2 League.

Club career
Born in the Aomori Prefecture, Kushibiki made his debut for Shimizu S-Pulse of the J1 League on 20 March 2013 in the J.League Cup against Ventforet Kofu in which he started and played the whole 90 minutes as Shimuzu drew the match 1–1.

National team career
In August 2016, Kushibiki was elected Japan U-23 national team for 2016 Summer Olympics. At this tournament, he played 1 match against Nigeria in first match.

Career statistics
Updated to end of 2018 season.

References

External links
Profile at Montedio Yamagata

1993 births
Living people
Association football people from Aomori Prefecture
Japanese footballers
Japan youth international footballers
J1 League players
J2 League players
J3 League players
Shimizu S-Pulse players
Kashima Antlers players
Fagiano Okayama players
J.League U-22 Selection players
Montedio Yamagata players
Thespakusatsu Gunma players
Footballers at the 2016 Summer Olympics
Olympic footballers of Japan
Association football goalkeepers